Jacquelyn Baginski (born 1985/1986) is an American politician who serves in the Rhode Island House of Representatives for the 17th district. A member of the Democratic Party, Baginski was first elected in the 2020 elections, succeeding retiring incumbent Robert Jacquard. Before being elected to the state house, Baginski ran a political consulting business, and she is noted for her extensive political ties.

References

21st-century American politicians
Democratic Party members of the Rhode Island House of Representatives
1980s births
21st-century American women politicians
Living people